The 2000–01 season of the Venezuelan Primera División, the top category of Venezuelan football, was played by 10 teams. The national champions were Caracas.

League table

Promotion/relegation playoff

External links
Venezuela 2000 season at RSSSF

Venezuelan Primera División seasons
Ven
Ven
2000–01 in Venezuelan football